Let's Go Dating (Chinese: 我们去相亲) is a variety programme produced by Mediacorp Channel 8. It is hosted by a rotating team of presenters composed of two from a team of the four hosts Youyi, Wang Weiliang, Tosh Zhang and Teddy Tang.

See also
Mediacorp Channel 8

References

2017 Singaporean television series debuts
2017 Singaporean television series endings
Channel 8 (Singapore) original programming